D.850 is a north to south state road in Turkey. It starts at Ünye at Black Sea coast and ends at Öncüpınar, the Syrian border check point. Since it runs all the way from north to south it crosses the three main west to east highways namely D.100, D.300 and  D.400.

Itinerary

References and notes 

850
Transport in Ordu Province
Transport in Tokat Province
Transport in Sivas Province
Transport in Malatya Province
Transport in Kahramanmaraş Province
Transport in Gaziantep Province
Transport in Kilis Province